The 1986–87 FIBA European Cup Winners' Cup was the twenty-first edition of FIBA's 2nd-tier level European-wide professional club basketball competition, contested between national domestic cup champions, running from 30 September 1986, to 17 March 1987. It was contested by 19 teams, three less than in the previous edition.

The 1985–86 FIBA European Champions Cup winners, Cibona, defeated the 1985–86 FIBA European Cup Winners' Cup runners-up, Scavolini Pesaro, in the final that was held in the Yugoslavia city of Novi Sad.

Participants

First round

|}

Second round

|}

Automatically qualified to the Quarter finals group stage
 Scavolini Pesaro (finalist)
 Ram Joventut
 Cibona

Quarterfinals

Semifinals

|}

Final
March 17, Dvorana SPC "Vojvodina", Novi Sad

|}

References

External links
 1986–87 FIBA European Cup Winner's Cup @ linguasport.com
FIBA European Cup Winner's Cup 1986–87

FIBA
FIBA Saporta Cup